Hobgoblin is a type of fairy or monster.

Hobgoblin may also refer to:

Hobgoblin (Dungeons & Dragons), an adaptation of the monster for the D&D role-playing game
Hobgoblin (comics), a comic book super-villain in the Marvel Comics universe, and an enemy of Spider-Man
"The Hobgoblin" (Spider-Man), an episode of Spider-Man: The Animated Series, featuring Marvel Comics' Hobgoblin as the villain
Hobgoblin (Imperial Guard), a different Marvel character also known as the Hobgoblin
Hobgoblin (character), a powerful magician in the 1948 Moomin novel Finn Family Moomintroll
Hobgoblin (beer), a type of beer manufactured by the UK-based Wychwood Brewery
Hobgoblin (novel), a 1981 horror novel by John Coyne
Hobgoblins (film), a 1988 B-movie, largely known for its appearance on Mystery Science Theater 3000
The Hobgoblin (1924 film), a 1924 German silent thriller film
The Hobgoblin (1990 film), alternate title for the movie Quest for the Mighty Sword
"Hobgoblin (song)", the lead single from CLC's 2017 album Crystyle
Þursaflokkurinn, an Icelandic progressive rock group the name of which means "The Hobgoblins" in English